Nordhorn (Northern Low Saxon: Nothoorn (or Notthoarn, Netthoarn and Noordhoorn)) is a town in Lower Saxony, Germany. It is the district seat of Grafschaft Bentheim in Lower Saxony's southwesternmost corner near the border with the Netherlands and the boundary with North Rhine-Westphalia.

Etymology

One story holds that the town's name – which means "North Horn" – came about when the town was under attack, in which case a horn – the so-called Nothorn or emergency horn – was blown by the watchmen to warn the Vechteinsel (Vechte Island) inhabitants and also to call for help. Since the town lay north of Bentheim (now Bad Bentheim) and its castle, it is said that this yielded the name Nordhorn.

A horn, however, was also used by the boatmen on the river Vechte to warn each other of ships' movements in fog. Since the 1970s, the Tuter ("Tooter"), a bronze memorial to the beginnings of inland shipping, has stood at the old harbour.

Since a settlement with a harbour arose between Schüttorf and Emlichheim in the Early Middle Ages whose coat of arms bore a horn as a charge, it seems likely that Nordhorn could have arisen from this.

A more scientifically based variation on what the arms mean holds that "horn" is meant in the sense of "pointed end", making "Nordhorn" a northern point – the jutting northerly end of a field into the Vechte Valley. Heinrich Specht pointed this out in his 1941 town chronicle in reference to the spur, or "horn", of land on which the town's first centre was built. (Lit.: Nordhorn Geschichte einer Grenzstadt. Publisher: Heimatverein der Grafschaft Bentheim)

A more fanciful story holds that the locals once worshipped the god Nod, Node or Nothe, the beginning of whose festival was heralded by blows on ox and cow horns. To pay homage to him, holy fire, called Nodfyr, was lit either by striking flintstones or by rubbing dry sticks together. From the god's name and the hornblowing, the town's name is said to have come.

The name actually has nothing to do with any emergency horn or any god named Nod.  "No(r)dhorn" is perhaps similar to the "Maa(r)s", "Meu(r)s" or "Marsh" river. That is what has caused the confusion; a silent "r" or a difficulty in pronouncing the "r" due to the proximity to France.

Nordhorn is called Nothoorn or Notthöörntin in the local speech. In the compilation Werdener Heberigister, the town's name is recorded in 890 as Norhthornon (note the silent "r") and in 1050 as Northornon. In 1184 it is Northorne. On town seals between 1400 and 1715 also appears the form Northorne, and only from 1827 forth does it become Nordhorn. (Lit.: Specht, 1941/1979).

Geography

Location
The town lies in southwesternmost Lower Saxony, near the border with the Netherlands and the boundary with North Rhine-Westphalia, on the river Vechte.

The landscape in and around Nordhorn is marked by the Vechte, the Vechtesee (lake), through which the Vechte flows, and three canals: the Süd-Nord-Kanal, the Nordhorn-Almelo-Kanal and the Ems-Vechte-Kanal.

Climate

Nordhorn lies in the Mid-European Temperate Zone. The climate is Subatlantic with rather mild winters and fairly warm summers.

Extent of the municipal area
Through various amalgamations the town's area has grown to 14 959 ha, only slightly smaller than the Principality of Liechtenstein.

Neighbouring communities
North of Nordhorn lie the town and joint community (Samtgemeinde) both called Neuenhaus, while the communities of Engden and Isterberg lie to the south. The town's western limit is also part of Germany's border with the Netherlands.

Constituent communities
Nordhorn is subdivided into 17 quarters ("Stadtteile"), grouped here under "older" and "newer".

Older quarters
Altendorf

The settlement of Nordhorn originally had its centre here, but on strategic grounds it was later moved to the island in the river Vechte. Town rights were granted in 1379, and this older centre was given the name Oude Dorp – "Old Village".

Bakelde

The name comes from Bak (ridge) and Lo (grove). (according to H.Specht - Nordhorn - Geschichte einer Grenzstadt)  ?Bach Alte?

Bimolten

Called Bimolt in 1252 and Bimolte in 1213, opinions are rather divided over the name's origin. Specht says it refers to heaps of earth, Reurik says it refers to a grove by the woods (bi'm holte, which in more modern German might be rendered bei dem Holze or beim Holz), and Abels holds that it refers to a settlement on the field. (according to Dr. Ernst Kühle - Bimolten - Jahrbuch des Heimatvereins 1973).

Bookholt

The name refers to a beech (Buche) or birch (Birke) grove. (according to H.Specht - Nordhorn - Geschichte einer Grenzstadt)

Brandlecht

Called Bramtelghet in 1313, the name comes from Bram (gorse) and telge (twig). (according to Dr. Ernst Kühle - Brandlecht - Der Grafschafter, Folge 160, June 1966).

Frensdorf

Called Frenstrup in Low German, the name might come from a personal name. It was also called Friethelstorpe or Frieldorp about 800, and Vrinsthorpe about 1000. (according to Dr. Ernst Kühle - Frensdorf - Jahrbuch des Heimatvereins 1971).

Frenswegen

Earlier also known as Vrendeswegen, the name's meaning could have been "lying on the way to Frensdorf".

Hesepe

The name Hesepe refers to the community's location on the river Vechte (epe means water). (according to Dr. Ernst Kühle - Hesepe - Jahrbuch, Heimatverein 1982)

Hestrup

Hestrup was first known in 1150 as Hersebruc and in 1212 as Hersedorp ("Steed Village"). The ending –dorf or –trup, which is cognate with the English word and placename ending "thorpe", identifies it as a farming community that came into being as an enclosed settlement about 800 with Christianity's arrival. (according to Dr. Ernst Kühle - Hestrup - Der Grafschafter, Folge 168, February 1967)

Hohenkörben

Hohenkörben arose about 600 as Hankorve in Bakelde's market on a dune ridge with limited space. An exact interpretation of its name has not been achieved; however, the town of Neuenhaus also has an outlying centre by the name of Hohenkörben-Veldhausen. (according to Dr. Ernst Kühle - Der Grafschafter, Folge 170, May 1967)

Newer quarters
Blanke

The Blanke (the article is used with the name in German – Die Blanke) was once a sunken heath and bog area, raised only at the edges, between which were water pools that glinted in the sunlight. Thus, they were also called Blänke. The two biggest were the "Große Blanke" and the "Kleine Blanke". By and by, this area dried up and before the Second World War there was building on the raised edges (Dorotheenstr., Klarastr.). After the war came more widespread settlement by refugees and textile workers. As a reference to the earlier heath ponds, the new neighbourhood was given the name Blanke, which is also so with some street names, such as Blankering and Innere Blanke. One can get an impression of what this area once looked like by visiting the Dutch nature protection area De Bergvennen west of Nordhorn.

Blumensiedlung

In the 1920s, a scheme was undertaken to build houses for jobless miners from the Ruhr area hired for the textile industry, and for young Nordhorn families. Because the streets were named after flowers, the new neighbourhood was called Blumensiedlung ("Flower Settlement").

Bussmaate

Earlier a meadowland, the so-called Buss Maate was owned by the farmer Busch in Altendorf (Buss from the farmer's name). About 1910, the textile manufacturer Rawe bought the land and had a spinning works built there. In 1913 there followed workers' dwellings.

Klausheide

This community was named for the son of the founder of the Klausheide Estate (Krupp von Bohlen und Halbach), who was named Claus (Heide means "heath"). At first, the settlement was known as die Claus-Heide.

Neuberlin

In the early 20th century, southeast of Denekamper Straße near Frensdorf a housing coöperative was founded on an initiative by a Mr. Mäulen. It then tackled the job of building houses. To thank Mr. Mäulen for his efforts, the new neighbourhood was named Neuberlin – literally "New Berlin" – after the city where he was born.

Stadtflur

In earlier centuries, Nordhorn's townsfolk had so-called peat cutting rights in this area, which at that time was moorland belonging to the community of Bakelde. In 1864, this area was divided and Nordhorn received this plot as part of its municipal area. It was therefore called the Stadtsche Flur, or "town lea". By the turn of the century there was building here and the area came to be called Stadtflur. Stadtflur now has roughly 7,700 inhabitants, putting it among Nordhorn's bigger Stadtteile.

Streng

Although the modern German meaning of streng is "stern" or "strict", the name actually comes from the so-called Strang ("string" or "strand"), a row of dunes. The Strang stretches from Bogenstraße to Nyhoegen Bridge on Bentheimer Straße. In the early 19th century, the textile manufacturer Ludwig Povel built workers' dwellings on the near part of the Strang in the Bogenstr.-Ludwigstr. area. On the farther part of the Strang, private houses were built in the 1930s and later.

Amalgamations
 25 June 1921 Frensdorf
 1 April 1929 Frenswegen
 1 July 1929 Altendorf, Bakelde, as well as parts of the communities of Bookholt, Hesepe and Brandlecht
 1 March 1974 Bimolten, Bookholt, Brandlecht, Hesepe, Hestrup, Hohenkörben – Nordhorn and Klausheide

History
Nordhorn's landscape was shaped millions of years ago by climate changes, especially the ice ages. The oldest sediments from a depth of about two thousand metres come from the Carboniferous. With the onset of the Cretaceous and Tertiary, the Earth's crust here formed itself into drape folds. In the mid-Tertiary, subtropical temperatures held sway on Nordhorn's plains. Thereafter began the gradual cooling, which reached its high point in the ice ages. After the last ice had melted, lowlands developed. Strong winds swept dunes up in the lifeless surface. Even today, the remains of such dune complexes can be found at the nearby Tillenberge (mountains). Archaeological finds from the Old Stone Age and the Bronze Age that followed bear witness to human settlement on Nordhorn's sand plains more than 6,000 years ago.

In the rainy and colder Ice Age, early people settled on the dry riverside heights along the river Vechte. Archaeologists come across traces of Iron Age settlements, the foundations of later farming communities such as Frensdorf, Bookholt, Altendorf, Hesepe and Bakelde, in almost every field.

From 12 BC to AD 10, the Roman commanders Drusus, Tiberius, Germanicus and Varus undertook in all thirteen campaigns in what was then still free Germany. From their camp in Xanten, these Roman troops would have undertaken forays into the lands of the Chamavi and Tubanti who then dwelt in the Nordhorn area. It is believed that the Romans used the prehistoric banks of the Vechte and sandy paths along the moors as military roads. This east-west overland connection would later become an important trade road, joining cities such as Brussels, Amsterdam, Bremen and Hamburg.

In the late 4th century, with the onset of the Migration Period (or Völkerwanderung), the Saxons were pushing in from the north and towards the west. They forced the Tubanti farther westwards into Twente. After Charlemagne's conquest of the Saxon lands, the first border between the Frankish Empire and Saxony, albeit as an internal boundary, came into being. This line has largely survived history's changing fortunes and still forms the German-Dutch border today.

In 687, Bishop Wilfrid of York sent missionaries across the sea to Christianize the former Tubanti land. Willibrord founded the Bishopric of Utrecht and Werenfried spread Christianity into the Vechte Valley. About 800, the settlement at Nordhorn was assigned to the Bishopric of Munster. Bishop Ludger built a wooden church on a spur of ground that thrust into the river's floodplain. About 900, the settlement's name was first mentioned in the Werden an der Ruhr Monastery's Heberegister as Northhornon.

About 1180, the Counts of Bentheim acquired the Nordhorn Gogericht (regional court). They built a castle in the middle of the river Vechte on an island. Until 1912, parts of this castle were still maintained. Nowadays, the Catholic St.-Augustinus-Kirche (church) stands there. After building a milldam and two mills, it became possible to regulate the river's water flow, thereby also making it possible to settle the island. Other waterways were built – it is supposed under Dutch builders' influence – which, it is believed, divided the island into six smaller ones. Once two gateway bridges were built and the castle was protecting it, it became easier to defend the settlement against attackers than was so for the old settlement around the market church. Today's main street, which has now grown into an attractive buying and selling place, might have already passed over the island at that time. Merchants and shipowners put down roots here; a marketplace arose. The name Nordhorn was henceforth used for the newer settlement, now standing on the threshold of becoming a town, whereas the old settlement around the market church came to be known as the "Old Village", and is indeed still known as Altendorf ("Old Village").

Nordhorn had taken a key place on the Flemish Road, the area of today's Bundesstraße 213 and 403 crossroads. Goods from Scandinavia and the Hanseatic towns found their way through Nordhorn into the trade centres to the west all the way to Paris. The Vechte was navigable as far up as Schüttorf.

Since modern land reclamation projects have been put in place, the river flows north of Zwolle into the Zwarte Water, which itself empties into the IJsselmeer, the lake that arose from the old Zuider Zee once the Afsluitdijk was completed.

Already by 1160, the first loads of Bentheim sandstone were being shipped into the Netherlands. Up to 1,200 freight cranes, scows and barges lay each year at anchor and brought their goods to Holland. The Steinmaate (street) became a staple market. The like-named street still recalls today that Bentheim sandstone was shipped from here to many other countries. From it were built stately buildings such as the Royal Palace in Amsterdam, but also many mills, churches, locks, town halls and other public buildings. The returning ships brought spices, textiles, paper and foods as well as luxury articles such as coffee, tea, cacao and tobacco. Trade, crafts and agriculture were the region's economic foundations until the mid 19th century. Shipping on the Vechte and the canals (the Ems-Vechte-Kanal, the Nordhorn-Almelo-Kanal, the Süd-Nord-Kanal and the Coevorden-Piccardie-Kanal) together with the transported goods formed an important source of earnings at this time, when the town was also home to wealthy merchants, shipowners and mariners.

On the ninth day after Whitsunday in 1379, Count Bernhard I granted Nordhorn town rights, and in 1416 also gave it privilege. The small settlement between the arms of the Vechte had grown to be important to the Bentheim Counts as a goods handling centre. With the economic upswing, cultural life also reached a high point in these years. Augustinian canons established the Marienwolde Monastery in Frenswegen in 1394. Through endowments and donations the monastery became well known as "Westphalia's Paradise" beyond borders. After secularization in 1806, brought about by Napoleon, monastic properties passed to the Bentheim Counts' ownership. The settlement spanning thousands of years and the town's thus far 628-year history have left behind very little in the way of buildings, besides the Marienwolde Monastery, as witness to earlier times.

In imitation of the Late Romanesque churches in neighbouring Westphalia, churches were built in the 13th century out of Bentheim sandstone. The only artwork preserved from this time is the baptismal font in Brandlecht. Bearing witness to the 15th century is the Alte Kirche ("Old Church") at the market. It was built in the Late Gothic style under Dutch influence and to honour Saint Ludger, who founded the town's first church, and in whose name this newer church was consecrated. It is likely that three generations worked on this impressive three-naved hall church. Originally, the tower was 102 m tall and fell under town council's stewardship as a watchtower and firetower. A violent storm toppled the steeple, which came down in the marketplace before the building. The new steeple was considerably shorter – about 70 m – and was designed to let wind pass through it. During restoration work inside the church in 1967, some paintings were uncovered in the sanctuary, the Nordhorner Apostelbilder ("Nordhorn Apostle Pictures"). They show the Twelve Apostles and various Biblical scenes. The paintings were preserved because it could not be agreed what should be done with them, since the Calvinist Church order of the Reformed Creed introduced by Count Arnold II at Bentheim in 1588 forbade pictures and adornment in church rooms. During more restoration work in the late 1990s, these pictures were rediscovered, and the church council decided to cover the pictures over with rice paper, as they seemed too valuable simply to paint over.

Sharply decimated by war and epidemics, the town had to deal with several occupations and troop movements in the 17th and 18th centuries. In the Eighty Years' War waged by the Dutch against the Spaniards, Nordhorn was a way station for Spanish troops because the neighbouring County of Lingen was Spanish territory. It is said that once, the Duke of Parma camped around Nordhorn with 6,000 soldiers.

During the Thirty Years' War, Swedes, Hessians, Lüneburg troops and Imperial forces passed through Nordhorn on the old Flemish army and trade road. They all wanted to feed on the scanty crop yields. The harried town, however, was left hardly any time to recover from the war's ravages. Only a few years later, the warlike Bishop Christoph Bernhard Count of Galen from Münster waged a war against the Dutch on the plains outside Nordhorn, which was brought to an end in 1666 by the Peace of Nordhorn.

In Napoleonic times there was once again much afoot in Nordhorn. In these years, the trading place on the Vechte grew and the two harbours defined the town's image. Napoleon's continental blockade against British trade made Nordhorn into a smuggling centre by 1806. The broad moors and heaths abetted this lucrative trade.

As a result of Europe's new political landscape in the wake of the Congress of Vienna in 1814 and 1815, the hitherto flourishing transit trade in Nordhorn was once again disrupted. The border became a customs barrier, stripping Nordhorn of its trading, which had been oriented towards the west. In the years that followed, the town became poorer. Because the Vechte could not be upgraded and modernized, and because it silted up, shipping was disrupted. The townsfolk turned to farming small plots and traders and shippers left town. Only home weaving still afforded some earnings. Whole families emigrated to the New World.

It is said that 1839 was the year when Nordhorn's textile industry was founded. The first mechanized weaving mill, established by Willem Stroink from Enschede, sprang up on the trade road. Here, cotton was processed and calico and watertwist were woven. Later mills were founded in 1864 by Jan van Delden and in 1851 by Josef Povel and Hermann Kistemaker. Textile manufacturing came to set the pace for the languishing economy. Progress came with gradual industrialization. The groundwork for the town's growth into one of Germany's biggest textile-producing towns had been laid.

The town's mayor between 1843 and 1872 was the apothecary and chemical manufacturer Ernst Firnhaber, whose house on the main street stood in the middle of what then was the town's business life. With its classicist building elements it is the last architectural example of a stately townsman's house from the 18th century. After the apothecary came Germany's first quinine plant. In 1843, 32,403 Pfund – roughly 16 metric tons – of cinchona was processed and exported. The manufacturers Ludwig Povel, Bernhard Rawe, Bernhard Niehues and Friedrich Dütting founded further textile businesses in the years from 1872 to 1897, some of which are still supplying domestic and international markets in the early 21st century.

In the 1890s, Nordhorn was incorporated into a network of man-made waterways. Through the river Ems, the Dortmund-Ems Canal and the Ems-Vechte Canal, coal was transported from the Ruhr area to the up-and-coming textile centre. The Nordhorn-Almelo Canal saw to it that the town was also connected to Dutch inland waterways, and the North-South Canal spurred the peat trade. Even if today all these canals have no further use for shipping, they can still be prized for their worth as sources of leisure.

The Bentheim Railway brought a rail connection to the international network in 1896. Roughly 1,500 people were working in the various textile companies in these years. The Great Depression in the 1920s led many jobseekers from all over Germany to Nordhorn. By 1939, the population had reached 23,457, and it is worth noting that just under a third of those people had actually been born in town. This unusual economic upswing earned Nordhorn the nickname Klein Amerika – "Little America".

Even the Third Reich left its mark on Nordhorn. The small Jewish community was annihilated. The synagogue was utterly destroyed, an event recalled by a memorial plaque on the street still called Synagogenstraße. The old Flemish Trade Road was used by German troops, who on 10 May 1940 marched into the Netherlands, as a military road. Some of the townsfolk lived through this time with very mixed feelings – were they not, they thought, bound to their Dutch neighbours by friendship and blood? These bonds were something upon which those seeking to fight persecution and the Nazi régime itself could build. Adolf Pazdera and Ferdinand Kobitzki, Nordhorn KPD functionaries and trade union secretaries, were persecuted many times and in 1943 and 1944 respectively, they were murdered in concentration camps.

After the World War II ended, nearly ten thousand people from Germany's lost eastern territories poured into Nordhorn, where they found a new home, soon bringing the town's population to more than 40,000. There arose a new community within the town housing 13,000 inhabitants, called die Blanke.

Non-commercial housing building companies and private initiatives made Nordhorn into "the town of the privately owned home". The enormous building accomplishments called for the municipal administration to be expanded and modernized. Thus, Nordhorn built itself a new town hall, and buildings for district administration, the employment office and the Amt court arose on the town's ring road. The court now stands on Seilerbahn.

Northwest Germany's first indoor swimming pool after 1945 could be dedicated, new schools, sport halls and fields, the concert and theatre hall and the town park led to the townscape's revival.

Religion

When the first church was built in Nordhorn is unknown. The story goes, however, that it stood at the guildfield and was named after Saint Ludger. Ludger was one of the first Christian missionaries in the area, and in 804 he became the first Bishop of Münster. In 809 he died near Billerbeck.

In the municipal area's northwest, a monastery of Augustinian Canons (Chorherrenstift) was founded in Frenswegen, earlier known as Marienwolde, in 1394. Its church, consecrated in 1444, was destroyed in 1881 by a lightning strike. The monastery was of great importance to Nordhorn and to places far beyond. Bit by bit the monastery building arose, and in the early 15th century, so did a church.

Also in Nordhorn, a bigger church was needed. On 6 July 1445, both churches were consecrated by an auxiliary bishop from Münster. The new Nordhorn church's patron was once again Saint Ludger. The three-naved Late Gothic market church was built out of Bentheim sandstone and with its 71-m-high steeple, it dominated the town's skyline.

After the Reformation (1517), Count Arnold I – and along with him almost the whole county – adopted the Lutheran faith in 1544. In 1588, the County of Bentheim (Grafschaft Bentheim) converted to the Reformed faith under Count Arnold II. Thereafter, the church at the market belonged to the Reformed parish. Count Arnold II, however, had come into contact with Calvin's teachings while studying in Strasbourg. A further link to the faith came with his marriage to Countess Magdalena of Neuenahr, who confessed the Reformed faith. The few Catholics left in Nordhorn had to go to services at the Frenswegen Monastery.

In 1578, the Augustinian Canons bought the castle on the Vechte Island in Nordhorn. In the manor house they established, among other things, a chapel. Now the Catholics once more had a room for their services, albeit a small one. In 1712 a small church was built next to the castle. The Augustinian Canons chose – alongside Saint Ludger, their order's patron saint – Saint Augustine of Hippo as the church's first patron.

At the time of Secularization by the Reichsdeputationshauptschluss, the monastery at Frenswegen was abolished. The year 1824 was an important one for the Augustinian community: the county, which for centuries had belonged to either the Bishopric of Utrecht or the Bishopric of Münster, was assigned to the Diocese of Osnabrück, while the community itself was raised to parish. The first minister was the Augustinian Canon Johann B. Cordes, who had been overseeing the community since 1810.

In 1826, the castle was converted into a church. In the late 19th century, the community grew very quickly; so plans were made to build a new, big church on the castle square on the Vechte. The castle was torn down. Models for the new church were found in Italy by the architect Keith from Hamburg, for instance the Pantheon in Rome or the San Giorgio in Venice. The church's footprint is octagonal. From 1911 to 1913, the building work was finished and the church's consecration was celebrated. The steeple was built together with the church. To offset any influence that the tower might have on the impression that the dome was meant to give, the tower stands somewhat to the side. A two-story arcade joins the steeple to the church. It is 45 m high and houses four bells. The church's dome – a peculiarity in northern Germany – shapes Nordhorn's skyline. Over the massive iron-concrete dome arches a wooden, copper-covered outer dome, crowned with a lantern. Its total height is 35 m.

Nordhorn's Lutheran Christians were first served from Lingen, and then from Bentheim. Once they had established their own parish, the Kreuzkirche ("Cross Church") was built in 1929 and 1930. Today roughly 20% of Nordhorners count themselves as Lutherans. There are three Lutheran churches.

All together, there are twelve Houses of God available in Nordhorn, seven of which have been built since the Second World War.

Nordhorn's synagogue was destroyed on Kristallnacht (9 November 1938). The town's Jews either emigrated or were deported and murdered, an event now marked by a memorial.

Population
Nordhorn has 53,608 inhabitants (as of 31 December 2006) in an area of 149.64 km2, making the population density 358 to a square kilometre.

Evangelical-Reformed Christians account for 28.14% of the population, while Lutherans account for 21.05% and Roman Catholics for 29.19%. Another 21.64% either are not members of any faith or adhere to other faiths.

Population development
(each time for 31 December)

Politics

Mayors

Town council
After the municipal election on 11 September 2016, the 42 council seats were apportioned thus:

The mayor, Thomas Berling, is also a voting member of town council.

Culture and sightseeing

Museums

The Town Museum (Stadtmuseum) in the Povelturm was opened in October 1996. Within, one can inform oneself about Nordhorn's history. On the upper floor of the Povelturm is the museum café, which offers a view over Nordhorn from a height of 26 m.

Buildings
Nordhorn has mostly kept itself from being spoiled by the few individual building styles of the postwar years. The town's appearance has kept the appealing red brickwork that has long been a tradition in northern Germany and in the neighbouring Netherlands. It is even seen in modern buildings. The new district building, for instance, combines the local building materials of brick and sandstone with glass, concrete and copper.

A fine example of restored architecture formerly overgrown by plant life is the Frenswegen Monastery from the 14th century in the town's northwest. A lightning strike in 1881 destroyed the church consecrated in 1445. The monastery buildings, however, were mostly preserved, even the square, two-floored cloister, the little wellhouse, the bridge over the moat and the impressive cellar vaulting. On the east wing's outer façade, a "Madonna and Child" made of Bentheim sandstone attracts the beholder's attention. After cautious renovations, the building now houses an ecumenical educational and meeting place whose origin and basis the unusually broad mix of faiths in Nordhorn and its environs is.

Traces of Gothic mark the Reformed church, which stands defiantly in Brandlecht's old village centre. Among examples of Romanesque sculpture is this church's baptismal font, which is Nordhorn's oldest artwork, made out of Bentheim sandstone, and still holds its original importance today.

At present, two buildings characterize Nordhorn's skyline. The Alte Kirche on the marketplace, built out of Bentheim sandstone in the 15th century and the Augustinuskirche, built in 1913 on the former castle's lands, can both be seen from afar. The inner town, today as in days of yore an island around which flows the Vechte, is now a pedestrian precinct.

Painstakingly restored façades, modern arcades, shops, boutiques and pleasant outdoor cafés invite one to tarry. The oldest building on the main street is the former mayor and chemical manufacturer Firnhaber's house, in which he both lived and worked. Behind the two-story classicist façade, the triangular gable with its hipped roof and a round-arched window with a plaster swag, the tradition of Nordhorn's first apothecary lives on.

When walking about town, one finds little oases untouched by hectic daily life. In big, parklike gardens, behind old trees and tall rhododendron hedges, stately manor houses may be discovered. These villas built on Dutch models were textile manufacturers' homes a hundred years ago. A walk through Nordhorn will in many places also still bring to light signs of the recent and more distant past, be it the town hall completed in 1952 with its little belltower or the old well at the park at the Völlinkhoff. Memories of a time when the heavy blocks of sandstone used in the oil mill's edgerunner still fulfilled their original function are brought forth at the town park.

When the grist mill and sawmill on the milldam were shut down, an almost 600-year history of milling came to an end in Nordhorn. These buildings were renovated and now offer an appealing venue for cultural events.

Nordhorn's industrial history was written by, among others, the Povel textile plant, which shut its gates in 1979 after nearly a hundred years of production. As a last witness to the town's economic heyday early in the last century, the former spinning works tower has been maintained as an industrial memorial. It serves today as a museum. The upper floor can be hired for private celebrations.

In the Bussmaate, a former boggy area, another textile plant with an adjoining residential area for textile workers was built a hundred years ago. In the early 1950s, Professor Emanuel Lindner, lecturer at Bauhaus and student of Mies van der Rohe, together with architect Eberhard Heinrich Zeidler, who now lives in Canada, designed expansion building works for this business. With a clearly structured glass façade, the timeless industrial building fits seamlessly into the industrial complex dating from the Gründerzeit. This building today stands empty and is to be converted for urban development.

Landscape
The Vechte's riverine landscape and the canals with their rows of trees are a popular place for a walk, and to enjoy the idyll. The canals, built more than 100 years ago for transport and draining the moorlands, now form part of a faunal habitat with many species and are now used for leisure and recreation. Sluices made out of sandstone and clinker, some still worked by hand, separate different water levels and are popular destinations for nature lovers.
Fields and meadows frame farmlands on the town's outskirts. Wetlands and heathlands with birches, junipers and orchids growing wild are marks of this rustic landscape. In the Tillenberge a small protected area with heather, gnarled oaks and junipers.

A fine legacy from the Gründerzeit is the Town Park (Stadtpark), a villa park of one of the earliest manufacturers. At the concert bowl in the Town Park, concerts regularly take place.

Sport

Euregium
The Euregium was actually built for the HSG Nordhorn. The name comes from the Euregio. The HSG team plays in the first handball Bundesliga. The Euregium is also used for other cultural events. It lies right near the vocational school and the district sport hall. The three halls' proximity to each other makes it possible to stage great tournaments. The Euregium has for a few years now been the venue for the Grafschafter Sportgala.

Eissporthalle
The Eissporthalle – "Ice Sport Hall" – has wed ice hockey and figure skating into one ice sport club. It was built in the mid-1970s. In 1984, the band BAP gave a concert there.

The ice sport club in Nordhorn changed its name several times. Until 1999 there was the GEC Nordhorn, which, among other things, played in the hockey Bundesliga, in what was then the second highest class. Thereafter the club called itself EC Euregio Nordhorn 1999 e. V. and will play in the coming season (2007–2008) in the Verbandsliga NRW. In 2002, the Eissporthalle was renovated from the ground up. It is also open to the public for skating.

Regular events
Yearly, over Whitsun weekend, a great table tennis tournament, the Euregioturnier is held. At the outdoor swimming pool there is also an international swimming tournament at Whitsun. The VfL Weiße Elf Nordhorn stages every year, also over Whitsun weekend, the Pfingstturnier ("Whitsun Tournament"), a traditional C-youth soccer tournament. In 2007 they held their 25th yearly tournament. The teams that take part come from all over Germany as well as from other European countries such as the Netherlands, Poland and Hungary.

German record
The football team Heseper SV, whose home field is in Nordhorn's south end, is a German record holder. Between 1996 and October 1999, the team managed to play a streak of 98 championship matches without being beaten, managing at the same time to rise from the fifth to the second district class. TSV Buchbach had held the old record with an unbeaten streak of only 75 matches.

Economy and infrastructure

Industry
Industrialization brought about a rise in population from 2,540 in 1903 to 18,104 in 1930, rising to 50,000 in the textile industry's heyday from the 1950s to 1970s.

Today, Nordhorn has roughly 53,500 inhabitants, and the trend is upward.

Once Nordhorn's biggest textile firms with up to 6,000 employees, NINO was until the 1980s one of Europe's leading textile producers. This stands out not least of all in coöperative efforts with renowned fashion photographers like Karl Lagerfeld and Helmut Newton. The only clothing manufacturer still in business in Nordhorn is Erfo Bekleidungswerk GmbH & Co. KG. The three formerly biggest companies, NINO, Povel and Rawe, are all gone.

Since the textile industry waned, mostly midsize businesses from various service and production areas have settled in town, albeit without quite managing to offset job losses due to the textile industry's virtual death. Even though Citibank's temporary presence, with 550 jobs, eventually folded – despite massive local subsidies – the location is still quite attractive for service businesses. This can be seen in the latest firm to locate in town, Bertelsmann, which will soon have 250 jobs. ETF EUROPEAN TRUCK FACTORY GmbH is located in this town.

Taken together, however, the shift in structure to the tertiary sector in and around Nordhorn, unlike in other regions, is very far advanced. The greater Nordhorn area is well off when compared with the country as a whole, with the Nordhorn employment agency area (Agenturbezirk) reporting the lowest jobless rate in Lower Saxony. The neighbouring region of Rheine in North Rhine-Westphalia, too, is experiencing a peak in employment. This is further substantiated in the 2005 land use planning report from the Federal Office for the Building Industry and Land Use Planning (Bundesamt für Bauwesen und Raumordnung) in which is discussed a forecast, based on current indicators, that sees in northwestern North Rhine-Westphalia and in Nordhorn and its environs an area with great economic dynamism in the coming years.

What should be highlit is the great number of food markets in Nordhorn, with Nordhorn having roughly twice the sales area proportionally by population as the national average. Because of the often misguided evictions, however, of newer locations outside the integrated sites, there are many empty premises in the inner town.

In March 2007, the Rawe-Ring-Center with roughly 22 000 m² of new sales area was opened on a plot that was once part of the Rawe textile factory. This project met with considerable opposition, mainly among local retailers and professionals. The retailers feared that the glut of new premises would bring about further vacancies, especially in the southern inner town, while professionals criticized the consequences for urban development, the lack of cleanup operations and above all the demolition of factory buildings that were protected as monuments. Despite 12,000 Nordhorners' protest signatures gathered by the Pro Grafschaft initiative, the project was endorsed by a majority of the local politicians and in the end put into action.

Under the slogan "Nordhorn - Die Wasserstadt" ("Nordhorn – the Water Town"), the town fathers are now seeking to put the emphasis on new aspects of the town's development, bringing forth plans to open canals for pleasure boats and to further development by building a town harbour. Whether these plans will indeed be implemented, and to what extent, remains to be seen in the coming years,

Also found at Nordhorn is the controversial bombing range, the Nordhorn Range. After the Second World War, this was first run by the Royal Air Force, but then later by the German Bundeswehr.

Transport
Nordhorn has two railway stations (Nordhorn and Nordhorn-Blanke), which are served by the RB 56 train service going to Neuenhaus and Bad Bentheim. These trains are operated by Bentheimer Eisenbahn and operate hourly. Passenger train services to Nordhorn resumed on 7 July 2019, after Nordhorn having been Germany's second-largest town without passenger trains for 45 years.

All together, Nordhorn has 2,807 parking spaces. The town lies near two Autobahnen, the A 30 and the A 31. It is furthermore connected to the highway network through two Bundesstraßen, the B 403 and the B 213.

The most popular means of transport in town is what is locally known as the Fietse – the bicycle (Fahrrad in Standard German, fiets in Dutch). The Nordhorners' fondness for the Fietse and their morning rides led to the building of a special cycling path network that runs throughout the district of Grafschaft Bentheim. Signposts, known locally as Paddestolen, show cyclists the way on these Fietsenpads (also a local term, the standard German word for them being Radwege). Cycle paths to the neighbouring Netherlands are in use.

Nordhorn has at its disposal a small airport in the outlying centre of Klausheide, called Nordhorn-Lingen (EDWN).

Through an initiative by the club Graf-SHIP, founded in 2003, state councillor Friedrich Kethorn approved on 14 November 2005 the reopening of the Ems-Vechte-Kanal to shipping, now allowing captains to bring ships of up to 12 m in length through the canal. Approval for the other two canals continues. The Klukkert-Hafen (port) was opened once again in 2006.

Culture

Old weaving mill
The old weaving mill once belonged to the Povel factory. Nowadays, the old weaving mill is a cultural centre for exhibitions, tourism and concerts. In the mill's building are found, alongside the county brewhouse, a musical pub for live acts and also Ems-Vechte-Welle, a regional radio station for Grafschaft Bentheim and the Emsland.

Jugendzentrum Nordhorn
The Jugendzentrum Nordhorn – Nordhorn Youth Centre – has existed since the early 1970s. It was Germany's first youth centre and is therefore also its oldest. It was once a farm. At first, only the "threshing floor" was used, but in the 1980s, the "barn" also came into use. In the 1980s, the barn was also the scene of the punk movement in Nordhorn.

Concerts were held in the barn, and still are, with such acts as Cochise, Geier Sturzflug, Helge Schneider, Killerpilze, Wir sind Helden and In Extremo. Early in 2007, the barn's ceiling lining was destroyed by a storm, but with help from unpaid workers, the youth centre had a complete, new paint job inside by the summer.

Tierpark Nordhorn
Nordhorn's animal park harbours on his premises compounds for exotic and also home-grown domestic animals, as well as a museum, a farm, a traditional pub and a playground.

Social institutions

Lebenshilfe Nordhorn
The Lebenshilfe – an institution dedicated to helping those with handicaps live full lives – was founded as early as 1963.

Now, the institution's organs assist, attend and take care of well over 600 people with handicaps. These organs include kindergarten for early assistance, various homes and also various workplaces (such as carpentry workshops), where clients can go with the proper guidance and according to each one's interests and talents. As well, there is the musical band Tabuwta, made up wholly of people with handicaps and supported by Lebenshilfe educational employees and celebrities such as Guildo Horn. In 2005 they recorded their third CD and presented it at the old weaving mill.

Vechtetalschule
The Vechtetalschule – Vechte Valley School – has existed as a school for those with a very broad array of handicaps since 1989. In 1992 it moved to a new building. It was given its name in 1997. Now, the school has 210 pupils, divided into 27 classes, ten of which are in outlying locations. Employed at the school are roughly 90 employees along with those doing community service (instead of military service), would-be teachers and trainees. Levels currently run at the school are Primary, Secondary I and Secondary II.

Notable people
Ernst Küppers (1904–1976), swimmer and coach of the Wassersportverein Nordhorn (Waspo) (1953–1965)
Otto Geisert (born 1939), footballer
Ernst-Joachim Küppers (born 1942), swimmer
Bernhard Brink (born 1952), entertainer and musician
Michael Schneider (born 1953), recorder player and conductor
Silke Pielen (born 1955), swimmer, Olympic medalist
Beate Merk (born 1957), politician (CSU), Bavarian State Justice Minister
Johnny de Brest (born 1963), artist and photographer
Petra Schmidt (born 1963), soprano
Paulo da Palma (born 1965), footballer
Albert Stegemann (born 1976), politician
Jan Fitschen (born 1977), long-distance runner
Simon Cziommer (born 1980), footballer
Anna-Lena Grönefeld (born 1985), tennis player

Twin towns – sister cities

Nordhorn is twinned with:
 Coevorden, Netherlands (1963)
 Montivilliers, France (1963)
 Reichenbach im Vogtland, Germany (1987)
 Malbork, Poland (1995)
 Rieti, Italy (2010)

References

Further reading
  (English-French-Dutch-German)
 Heinrich Specht, Bürgerbücher der Stadt Nordhorn von 1396-1913, Nordhorn 1939
 Heinrich Specht, Wappen und Siegel der Stadt Nordhorn, aus Nordhorner Nachrichten Nr. 213, 194 (1941): Ältere Nordhorner Wappenzeichen,
 Alfred Dietrich, Nordhorn - Textilstadt im Grünen, Oldenburg 1966
 Bernd-Andreas Knoop + Jörg-Uwe Seifert, Nordhorn - Gesichter einer Stadt, 1976
 VHS Grafschaft Bentheim (publisher), Nordhorn nach 1945, Nordhorn, 1977
 Heinrich Specht, Nordhorn - Geschichte einer Grenzstadt, Nordhorn 1941; 1979. publisher: Heimatverein der Grafschaft Bentheim.
 Clemens v. Looz-Corswarem + Michael Schmitt (publisher), Nordhorn - Beiträge zur 600 jährigen Stadtgeschichte, 1979
 Bernd-Andreas Knoop + Fritz Schöbel, Das war die Festwoche - 600 Jahre Stadt Nordhorn, 1979
 VHS Grafschaft Bentheim (publisher), 35 Jahre Volkshochschule der Stadt Nordhorn, Bad Bentheim, 1983
 Gerhard Plasger, Nordhorn in alten Ansichten, 1983
 Gerhard Plasger, Nordhorn - Bilder der Vergangenheit, 1986
 VHS Grafschaft Bentheim (publisher), Mühlen und Müller, Nordhorn, 1987
 Wilfried P. Delissen et al., Nordhorn - Spuren und Notizen, Nordhorn 1988
 Herbert Wagner: Militär in der Region, Dokumentation über den Artillerieschieß- und Bombenabwurfplatz Engdener Wüste / Nordhorn - Range, Bad Bentheim, 1989
 neomdedia GmbH (publisher), Nordhorn - Grenzstadt ohne Grenzen, 1989
 VHS Grafschaft Bentheim (publisher), Nordhorn im 3. Reich, Nordhorn, 1991
 Bernd-Andreas Knoop, Das große Buch der Grafschaft, Lage 1994
 VHS Grafschaft Bentheim (publisher), Nordhorn - eine Zeitreise, Nordhorn, 1998
 Schwester M. Willibaldis, St. Augustinus Nordhorn, Nordhorn 2003
 Herbert Wagner: Die Gestapo war nicht allein... Politische Sozialkontrolle und Staatsterror im deutsch - niederländischen Grenzgebiet 1929 - 1945, Münster 2004

External links 
  
 

Germany–Netherlands border crossings
1370s establishments in the Holy Roman Empire
1379 establishments in Europe
County of Bentheim (district)